Tashkent State Technical University (TSTU) (Uzbek: Toshkent Davlat Texnika Universiteti) is one of the oldest universities of Uzbekistan. Currently, the university consists of 6 faculties, and prepares highly skilled professionals in technical and engineering fields. For this year, it is estimated to run 56 departments with over 10 746 students, who are taught by 6 academicians of the Academy of Sciences of Uzbekistan, 74 doctors of sciences and 314 candidates of sciences.

History 
The history of "Tashkent State Technical University," named after Abu Rayhan Beruni ('’’TSTU'’’), goes back to the Soviet Union times. TSTU is currently one of the oldest educational places in Uzbekistan. Its first establishment date refers to the April 21, 1918. Firstly, the university was established as the small technical faculty of "Turkistan National University", and it worked for the whole Central Asia.
That technical faculty saw many changes in its history, but it is the base of current "Tashkent State Technical University". In 1923 it was re-set as the new faculty called "Engineering-melioration faculty". After 6 years, in 1929 in base of this faculty, there was created new institute called "Central Asian cotton-irrigation institute". After 4 years, in 1933 this institute became the fundament for new and unique technical university in Central Asia. From the year of 1949 it was renamed to "Central Asian Poly Technical Institute". From the year 1961 it was called as the "Tashkent Poly Technical institute". In 1973 it was named after one of the greatest scientists of Uzbekistan Abu Rayhan Beruni, and was called as the "Tashkent Poly Technical Institute named Abu Rayhan Beruni". After the Independence of Uzbekistan, by the edict President of Republic Uzbekistan Islam Karimov, university was renamed to "Tashkent State Technical University named after Abu Rayhan Beruni" and it became one of the leading educational centers of Uzbekistan. Based on the decree of the President of Uzbekistan Shavkat Mirziyoyev dated January 25, 2017, on June 23, 2017, the Tashkent State Technical University was named after Islam Karimov. University has passed about 100 years of history to get its current name "Tashkent State Technical University named after Islam Karimov" and to reach its current prestige. President of Republic Uzbekistan Islam Karimov has also graduated from this university.
During its long history the "Tashkent State Technical University" has become the base for 16 other universities and colleges in Uzbekistan, which are "Fergana Poly Technical Institute" (1967), "Tashkent Institute of Automobile and Highways"(1972), "Samarkand architectural institute"(1980), "Bukhara Technological Institute of Food and Light Industry" (1977), "Namangan Engineering-Economic Institute" (1973), "Navoi State Mining Institute" (1995), "Andijan Institute of Engineering Economics and Management (1995), "Tashkent Engineering Institute" (1989), "Tashkent Institute of Chemical Technology" (1991), "Tashkent Architecture and Construction Institute" (1991), "Karshi Engineering-economic Institute" (1995), "Tashkent State Institute of Aviation" (1995), "Nukus Industrial-Pedagogical Institute" (1995), "Angren Technical College" (1995), "Almalyk Technical College" (1995), "Chirchik Technology College" (1995). History of the University tdtu.uz checked April 12, 2022</ref>

General Information 
There are 8 faculties, 58 departments, 735 professors-teachers and more than 11 thousand students at Tashkent State Technical University. Tashkent State Technical Institute nowadays trains specialists and professionals following the educational programs which are listed below:
 Bachelor’s degree, duration 4 years
 Master’s degree, duration 2 years
 Doctoral degree, duration 3 years
Moreover, the university has 5 specialized councils, in which people defend their doctoral dissertations in 12 fields. Recently, the University has held over 200 projects which are founded by the Republic Uzbekistan. In addition, there 6 scientific magazines published every week in the Tashkent State Technical University and they are: "Technical science and innovation", "", "Ta'lim tizimida ijtimoiy-gumanitar fanlar", "Energiya va resurs tejash muammolari", "Chemical Technology, Control and Management", "", "Kompozitsion materiallar", "Texnika Yulduzlari"

Missions 
Just as other universities, "Tashkent State Technical University" has set its own missions in development of technical field in Uzbekistan. They are stated in the official document and constitution of the university. Mission of the university can also be looked as the strategy of development of this university, and it is approved by the rectors of the university and the government representatives of Uzbekistan. There are 4 main missions and plans for development in Tashkent State Technical University, and they are given as follows:
 Satisfy the needs of society in the qualified professionals on technical field;
 Developing and upbringing of well educated person, with required professional competences;
 Developing scientific institutions with high world standards;
 Training qualified, competent and democratically thinking specialists.

Recognizable graduates 
Tashkent State Technical University is popular in Uzbekistan because it has trained dozens of academicians, state prize laureates, hundreds of inventors, professors and doctors. There are a number of graduates from Tashkent State Technical University who have contributed their knowledge in development of Uzbekistan, and became academicians of technical sciences. The following list of 19 academicians of technical sciences who graduated from Tashkent State Technical University:

 Abdullayev Xabib Muxamedovich (1912–1962)
 Urazboev Muxammad Toshevich (1906–1971)
 Homidxonov Muzaffar Zohidxonovich (1916–1972)
 Orifov Ubay Orifovich (1905–1976)
 Axmedov Karim Sodiqovich (1914–1996)
 Fozilov Hosil Fozilovich (1909–2003)
 Qobulov Hosil Qobulovich (1921 – )
 Akramxodjayev Abid Muratovich (1920–1996)
 Xamrobayev Ibragim Xamrabayevich (1920–2002)
 Nabiyev Malik Nabievich
 Mavlonov G'ani Orifxonovich (1910–1988)
 Boymuhamedov Hosil Nurmatovich (1918–1990)
 Uklonskiy Aleksandr Sergeyevich (1888–1972)
 Salimov Oqil Umrzoqovich (1928)
 Mirkomilov Tulgin Mirolilovich (1939–2004)
 Salimov Zokirjon (1940)
 Rahimov Gofir Rahimovich (1905–1972)
 Rahimov Vahob Raximovich (1934–2014)
 Yusupbekov Nodirbek Rustambekovich (1940)

Contacts with International Universities 
Tashkent State Technical University holds meetings with different universities and educational centers all around the globe each year. The reason for this meetings is signing contracts with international universities, in order to inherit knowledge from those universities and exchange students because of the practice purpose. There were more than 10 delegations from international universities so far, and they are listed below.

Delegation from USA 
In 2016 on the dates of 11th, 12th, and January 13 there was meeting in Tashkent State Technical University. The main reason of the meeting was enlarging practical skills of the students. Guest lecturer was from "Wisconsin-Madison University (US), professor Sundaram Gunesekaran. Topic of the speech was about metrology.

Older meetings 

On June 11 the year of 2015, meeting was held with French delegation.

On May 18, 2015 there was meeting with the delegation of Russian Technical University.

On April 16, 2015 there was the meeting with delegation from "Scientific-research University of Information Technologies".

On April 14, 2015 there was the visit of rector of "Moscow State Technical University".

On April 13, 2015 vice-rector of "Poland Technical University" visited the "Tashkent State Technical University" on universal issues.

On April 7, 2015, Tashkent State Technical University received Council of Latvia, and signed a contract with "Riga Technical University".

On March 28, 2015, president of "Xolon Technical University" visited the "Tashkent State Technical University".

Rectors 
Currently, the rector of "Tashkent State Technical University" is Saydaxmedov Ravshan Xalxodjayevich. In the history of "Tashkent State Technical University" there were 17 rectors including Mr.Saydaxmedov Ravshan Xalxodjayevich. And they are listed below:

Kolbasnikov I.V (1934–1939)
Suxanov A.R (1939–1940)
Abdullayev H.M (1940–1941)
Shmidt M.A (1941–1943)
Tuxtaxujaev S.T (1943–1947)
Niyozov M.I (1947–1963)
Urazboev M.I (1963–1971)
Xomitxonov M.Z (1971–1972)
Axmedov K. S (1972–1988)
Jalilov A.T (1988–1991)
Yusupbekov N.R (1991–1992)
Salimov O.U (1992–1994)
Mirkomilov T.M (1994–2001)
Allaev Q.R (2001–2005)
Shoobidov Sh.A (2005–2011)
Adilxodjaev A.I (2011–2013)
Saydaxmedov R.X (2013 – )

Faculties 
There are eight faculties in the university: the Faculty of Thermal Power Engineering; the Faculty of Electronics and Automation; the Faculty of Energy; the Faculty of Geology and Mining; the Faculty of Mechanical Engineering; the Faculty of Mechanics; the Faculty of Oil and Gas; and the Faculty of Engineering Technology.

Faculty of Electronics and Automation 
The Faculty of Electronics and Automation is one of the oldest faculties of Tashkent State Technical University., The current dean of the faculty is Zikrillayev Xayrulla Fatxullayevich . There are nine departments within the faculty:
 Metrology
 Automating and controlling of creation process
 Electronics and microelectronics
 Radio-electric constructions
 Information technologies in controlling
 Tools
 Theoretical electro-technologies
 Information technologies
 Physics

There are nine bachelor's degree branches and thirteen master's degree branches in the faculty.

Faculty of Energy 
The Faculty of Energy trains specialists in the energetics field. Currently, the dean of the faculty is Toshov Javoxir Bo'rievich. There are eight departments in the faculty:

 Hydraulics and hydraulics energy
 Energy of heat
 Calculus
 Branches and systems of electric stations
 Electric supplement
 Electro technics and energy
 Electro technics, electro mechanics and electro technologies
 Electro mechanics and fiber techniques

There are five branches for bachelor's degree, and thirteen branches for master's degree at "Faculty of energy".

Faculty of Geology and Mining 
The Faculty of geology has nine departments, which are:

 Mining work
 Geology and seeking of valuable mined materials
 Geology, mineralogy
 Hydrogeology and geophysics
 Electro-mechanics of mining
 Geodesia
 Metallurgy
 Physical education and sport
 Foreign languages

Faculty of Mechanical Engineering 
The Faculty of Mechanical Engineering's dean is Berdiyev Dorob Murodovich. There are ten departments in this faculty:

 Mechanical technologies
 Technical machine and tools
 Materializing and material technology
 Transport systems
 Technique and service of agricultural industry
 Utilization of mechanical materials
 Energy mechanical machines
 Machine parts
 Mechanics
 Geometry and graphing

Faculty of Engineering Technology 
 Currently the dean of the faculty is Makhmudov Nazirila Nasimkhanovich. The faculty has departments:

 Biomedical engineering
 Ecology and environment protection
 Corporate governance
 Biotechnology
 Chemistry
 Oil and gas mines’ geology
 Industrial Design

Location 
Tashkent State Technical University named after Islam Karimov is located in Uzbekistan, Tashkent city, Olmazor district, University street 2, 100095.

See also 

TEAM University Tashkent
Turin Polytechnic University in Tashkent
Inha University in Tashkent
Tashkent Institute of Irrigation and Melioration
Tashkent Financial Institute
Moscow State University in Tashkent named M.V Lomonosov
Tashkent Automobile and Road Construction Institute
Tashkent State University of Economics
Tashkent State Agrarian University
Tashkent State University of Law
Tashkent University of Information Technologies
University of World Economy and Diplomacy
Westminster International University in Tashkent

References 

National Encyclopedia of Uzbekistan

External links 
Article about the University in Russian
Article about the university in Tashkent
Official web-site of the University
Article
 Structure of the University

Buildings and structures in Tashkent
Tashkent State Technical University
Education in Tashkent